BLZ may mean:
 Belize
 IATA airport code for Chileka International Airport, Blantyre, Malawi
 Bankleitzahl, a numbering system for German and Austrian banks